The Shanghai International Marathon is an annual marathon in late autumn hosted by Shanghai, China, since 1996.  The marathon is categorized as a Platinum Label Road Race by World Athletics.

The marathon starts at the Bund Bull and finishes at Shanghai Stadium.

History 

The inaugural race was held in 1996 as the "Shanghai International Citizen Marathon".

For the 2020 edition of the race, due to the coronavirus pandemic, only the full marathon was run, the field was limited to 9,000 runners, and the finish was moved to the West Bund Art Center.

Course 

The marathon starts at the Bund Bull and finishes at Shanghai Stadium.

Other races 
All three races begin at the Bund Bull, but the mini marathon ends at the Shanghai Exhibition Centre while the 10K ends at Fuxing Park.

Winners 

The men's course record was set in 2015 as Kenya's Paul Lonyangata of 2:07:14 hours and the Ethiopian Yebrgual Melese broke the women's record in 2018 with 2:20:36 hours.

Key: Course record (in bold)

Notes

References

External links
Official website
marathoninfo

Marathons in China
Sports competitions in Shanghai
Recurring sporting events established in 2000
Autumn events in China
2000 establishments in China